Etheria: Ang Ikalimang Kaharian ng Encantadia (International title: Etheria: The Fifth Kingdom of Encantadia) is a Philippine television drama fantasy series broadcast by GMA Network. The series is the second installment of the Encantadia franchise. Directed by Mark A. Reyes and Gil Tejada Jr., it stars Sunshine Dizon, Iza Calzado, Karylle, Diana Zubiri, Dingdong Dantes and Dennis Trillo. It premiered on December 12, 2005 on the network's Telebabad line up replacing Encantadia. The series concluded on February 17, 2006 with a total of 50 episodes. It was replaced by Encantadia: Pag-ibig Hanggang Wakas in its timeslot.

The series is streaming online on YouTube.

Premise
After peace was restored in Encantadia, the past sneaks up on the sisters. With the lives of their loved ones at stake, they must go back in time to stop a tribe in their plan to destroy the present. In their journey, questions would be answered and the sisters must destroy the past to save the present.

Cast and characters

Main cast
 Iza Calzado as Amihan
 Sunshine Dizon as Pirena
 Karylle as Alena
 Diana Zubiri as Danaya
 Dingdong Dantes as Ybrahim / Ybarro / Alexus
 Alessandra de Rossi as Andora
 Francine Prieto as Avria
 Jopay as Juvila
 Nadine Samonte as young Mine-a
 Pauleen Luna as Odessa
 Dennis Trillo as young Raquim

Supporting cast
 Benjie Paras as Wahid
 Alfred Vargas as Amarro
 Cindy Kurleto as Cassiopeia
 Ryan Eigenmann as Marvus
 Sid Lucero as young Asval
 Aiza Marquez as young Gurna
 Justin Cuyugan as Arkrey
 Paolo Paraiso as Animus
 Rainier Castillo as Nakba
 Mike "Pekto" Nacua as Banak
 Empress Schuck as young Cassiopea
 Ella Guevara as Cassandra
 BJ Forbes as young Aquil
 Arthur Solinap as Muros
 Ping Medina as young Hagorn
 Tirso Cruz III as Barkus
 Tonton Gutierrez as Memen
 Raymond Bagatsing as Emre
 Gary Estrada as Meno
 Glydel Mercado as Ornia
 Angel Aquino as Ether
 Daniel Fernando as Cilatus
 Chinggoy Alonzo as Evades
 Nonie Buencamino as Bartimus
 Rachel Lobangco as As'nan
 Michael Flores as Arvark
 Maricel Morales as Ora
 Simon Ibarra as Arde
 Jason Zamora
 Rich Vergara
 Noel Urbano as the voice of Imaw / Aegen
 Andrei Felix as Enuo
 Frank Garcia as Xenos
 KC Montero as Eldrin
 Neil Ryan Sese as Viktu

References

External links
 
 

2005 Philippine television series debuts
2006 Philippine television series endings
Encantadia
Fantaserye and telefantasya
Filipino-language television shows
GMA Network drama series
Philippine time travel television series